Taha Abderrahmane, (born on 28 May 1944)  is a Moroccan  philosopher, and one of the leading philosophers and thinkers in the Arab-Islamic world. His work centers on logic, philosophy of language and philosophy of morality and contractarian ethics. He believes in multiple modernities and seeks to establish an ethical and humanitarian modernity based on the values and principles of Islam and the Arab tradition.

Early life and education
Abderrahmane was born on 28 May 1944, and raised in El Jadida (province of El Jadida) there he went to basic school, after that he moved to Casablanca where he continued his high school, and then he joined the Mohammed V University (Rabat, Morocco) where he obtained his licentiate in philosophy. He completed his studies at the university of Sorbonne where he received his second licentiate and obtained his doctoral third level in the year of 1972 on the subject: "Language and philosophy: a study of the linguistic structures of ontology", and in 1985 he earned his Ph.D. in the philosophy on the subject "study of argumentation and its methods" (in French: Essai sur les logiques des raisonnements argumentatifs et naturels, literally "Essay on the logic of reasoning argumentatives and naturals").

In addition to speaking Arabic, French and English, he also reads German, Latin and Ancient Greek - in order to read philosophy authors in their original language.

Two notes on the name: First, he is known in all his books as Taha Abderrahmane, though his first name is Abderrahmane and Taha is his family name; scholars in English often repeat "Abderrahmane" as if it were his family name, following the way it appears in his books, while in the Arab world often the repeated name is Taha, and his philosophy is known as "Taha'iyya", i.e. "Taha'ian". Second, the right and official spelling of his name in his official documents is Abderrahmane, and not Abdurrahman or Abdul Rahman.

Career in academia
Abderrahmane served as a professor of philosophy of language and logic at Mohammed V University from 1970 until his retirement in 2005. He is a member of the International Society for the Study of Argumentation which he represents in Morocco, representative of Gesellschaft für Interkulturelle Philosophie / Society of Intercultural Philosophy, and director of Wisdom Circle for Thinkers and Researchers.

He was awarded the Prize of Morocco twice, and in 2006 the ISESCO Prize in Islamic thought and philosophy.

Characteristics of his method
His philosophical practice is characterized by a combination of "logical analysis" and "linguistic derivation" proceeding a mystical experience, in a framework to provide the concepts related to the Islamic heritage and based on the most important achievements of modern Western thought on the level of "theories of speech" and "argumentative logic" and "philosophy of ethics", which makes his philosophizing predominantly appearing in a "moral" and "deliberative" style.

Most important works
 Language and philosophy: an essay on the linguistic structures of ontology (in French), 1979
 A treatise on deductive and natural argumentation and its models (in French), 1985
 Formal Logic and Grammar, 1985
 On the basics of Dialogue and Renovation of the Islamic theology, 1987
 Religious Practice and Renewal of the Reason, 1989
 Renovation of the Method in Assessing the Heritage, 1994
 Praxeology of philosophy-I. Philosophy and Translation, 1994
 Language and Balance, or Multiplicity of Reason, 1998
 Praxeology of Philosophy-II. 1-The Philosophical sentence, the book of the Concept and etymology, 1999
 The question of Ethics – a contribution to Ethical criticism of Western Modernity, 2000
 Dialogues for the Future, 2000
 The Arabic Right to differ in Philosophy, 2002
 The Islamic Right to be Intellectually Different, 2005
 The Spirit of Modernity, an Introduction to founding Islamic Modernity, 2006
 Modernity and Resistance, 2007
 The Question of Practice, 2012
 The Spirit of Religion, 2012
 Dialogue as Horizon of Thought, 2013
 The Poverty of secularism, 2014
 The Question of Method: Toward a New paradigm in thinking, 2015
 The Post-Secularism: A Critique of the separation between Ethics and Religion, 2016
 The Wandering of The Post-Secularism, 2016
 The Religion of Decency, 2017
 Ethical Concepts between Fiduciarism and Secularism, 2 volumes, 2021.
 Fuduciarist Foundation of the science of purposes, 2022.

References

Sources
Arabic Wikipedia
Wisdom Forum for Thinkers and Researchers
Mohammed Hashas, "Islamic Philosophy III: The Question of Ethics: Taha Abderrahmane's Praxeology and Trusteeship Paradigm," Resetdoc, 23 Sept. 2014, http://www.resetdoc.org/story/00000022452
Mohammed Hashas, “Taha Abderrahmane’s Trusteeship Paradigm: Spiritual Modernity and the Islamic Contribution to the Formation of a Renewed Universal Civilization of Ethos,” Oriente Moderno 95 (2015), pp. 67–105.
Mohammed Hashas, L’etica islamica nel paradigma di responsabilità di Taha Abderrahmane, traduzione a cura di Sabrina Lei (Roma: Tawasul Europe, Centro per la ricerca ed il dialogo, 2018), 53 p. 
Mohammed Hashas, The Idea of European Islam: Religion, Ethics, Politics and Perpetual Modernity (London and New York: Routledge, 2019), Chapters 6-7.
Wael Hallaq, Reforming Modernity: Ethics and the New Human in the Philosophy of Abdurrahman Taha, Columbia University Press, 2019, 376p. .
Mohammed Hashas and Mutaz al-Khatib, eds., Islamic Ethics and the Trusteeship Paradigm: Taha Abderrahmane's Philosophy in Comparative Perspectives (Leiden: Brill, 2020) pp. 382. .
Mohammed Hashas, “The Arab Right to Philosophical Difference: The Concept of the Awakened Youth in the Political Philosophy of Taha Abderrahmane,” in Islam in International Affairs: Politics and Paradigms, eds. Nassef Manabilang Adiong, Raffaele Mauriello, and Deina Abdelkader (Routledge, Wordling beyond the West book series, 2019) pp. 39–61. ISBN 9781138200937.
Mohammed Hashas, "The Political Theology of Taha Abderrahmane: Religion, Secularism, and Trusteeship,” in Islamic Political Theology, eds., Massimo Campanini and Marco di Donato (New York and London: Lexington Books, 2021), pp. 113–133. ISBN 978-1-4985-9058-7
Yousef AlQurashi, "Is Taha Abdurrahman a Contractarian Philosopher?", journal of Islamic Research 33 (3), 704-721 ,  DOI: 10.17613/ngj0-4b06.

External links
 Wisdom Circle for Thinkers and Researchers
 Samir Abouzaoid, Professor Taha Abdurrahman, arabphilosophers.com
 

Muslim reformers
20th-century Moroccan philosophers
21st-century Moroccan philosophers
Islamic philosophers
Mohammed V University alumni
Academic staff of Mohammed V University
Living people
1944 births
International Union of Muslim Scholars members